Twenty-Nine Kisses from Roald Dahl is a 1969 short story collection for adults by Roald Dahl.

The collection contains Someone Like You (1953) and Kiss Kiss (1960), Dahl's second and third short story collections. These twenty-nine stories, written over a period of sixteen years, comprise the core of Dahl's short fiction.

See also
 Danny, the Champion of the World

References

1969 short story collections
Short story collections by Roald Dahl
Michael Joseph books